Anna Tuthill Harrison (née Symmes; July 25, 1775 – February 25, 1864) was the first lady of the United States in 1841 as the wife of President William Henry Harrison. She served in the role for only one month, as her husband was afflicted with pneumonia and died shortly after his term began. She was also the paternal grandmother of President Benjamin Harrison. She never entered the White House during her tenure as first lady, remaining the only presidential wife to never visit the capital during her husband's presidency. At age 65 at the start of her husband's presidential term, Harrison was the oldest woman ever to assume the role of first lady, a record held until Jill Biden became first lady at age 69 in 2021. She also has the distinction of holding the title for the shortest length of time, and the first first lady to be widowed while holding the title. Harrison was the last first lady to have been born before the inauguration of George Washington.

Anna was raised by her grandparents in Long Island and given an education better than that of most women. She married military officer William Henry Harrison against her father's wishes in 1795, and she raised their family of ten children in the frontier of Ohio and Indiana while William pursued a political career. Anna would see nine of her ten children die over the following decades, causing her to become more deeply involved in her Presbyterian faith. She became first lady when William became president in 1841, though she did not attend his inauguration. William died while Anna was preparing to travel to Washington, D.C., only one month into his term. Anna lived the remainder of her life in Ohio, first in their family log cabin, and then with her only surviving son. Her short tenure as first lady, her absence from the White House, and the destruction of her personal papers in a fire have caused her to be overlooked by historians, and her life has been the subject of relatively little scholarly analysis.

Early life
Anna Tuthill Symmes was born on July 25, 1775, in Sussex County, New Jersey. She was the second child of John Cleves Symmes and Anna Tuthill. Her father was an associate justice on the Supreme Court of New Jersey. Anna's mother died on Anna's first birthday, and she was raised by her father for the following three years. Later in the American Revolutionary War, her father fought as a colonel in the Continental Army. To protect Anna, he disguised himself as a British soldier and carried her to Long Island to stay with her maternal grandparents. One anecdote describes him carrying a second bag holding turnips, claiming to be delivering them to the British commander.

Anna was raised by her grandparents, receiving an unusually broad education for a woman of the times. She attended Clinton Academy in East Hampton on Long Island, and the private school of Isabella Graham in New York City. She was raised as a Presbyterian, and her education had a strong religious component. Her father visited her at the end of the war in 1783, but she otherwise did not see him, as he had moved to the Northwest Territory. In 1794, at the age of 19, Anna went to live with her father and her stepmother Susannah Livingston. Her father had acquired land in the Northwest Territory where he founded the town of North Bend, Ohio.

Marriage and family 
While visiting her sister Maria in Lexington, Kentucky, Anna met military officer William Henry Harrison, and they began a courtship. Anna's father disapproved, fearing that Harrison had few prospects outside of the army and that he would not be able to provide for a family. He also had a low opinion of soldiers in the Northwest Territory, seeing them as little more than criminals.

While her father was away on business, the couple eloped and married on November 25, 1795. The location of their wedding is disputed; some historians place it in the home of the presiding minister, Dr. Stephen Wood, while others place it in the home of Anna's father. Anna's father did not speak to his new son-in-law for weeks before he eventually demanded to know how William intended to support a family with Anna. William is quoted as saying either, "by my sword, and my own right arm, sir" or "my sword is my means of support, sir." John would grow to respect William, eventually campaigning on William's behalf and naming William an executor of his estate.

After they married, they moved to Fort Washington where William was stationed. Anna lived as an army wife, moving with her husband wherever he was stationed. As their family grew, they decided to find a permanent home. William resigned from the army in 1798, purchased 169 acres of land in North Bend, and built a log cabin to accommodate the growing family. William and Anna would go on to have ten children, beginning in 1796. Nine of them preceded Anna in death.

Husband's rise to fame

In 1799, William was elected to the House of Representatives, and the family moved to Philadelphia, the country's capital. In 1800, they traveled to Richmond, Virginia to visit William's family, and Anna had her third child there. Later that year, William was appointed territorial governor of Indiana, and they moved to Vincennes, Indiana. In 1804, William built a brick house, Grouseland, which would become a social hub for the territory in addition to serving as the family's home. Attacks on families by Native American soldiers was common in the region, and the home was built to be readily defensible so that the children could be hidden inside when necessary. A Methodist minister lived with the Harrisons in Grouseland. He was responsible for the children's spiritual education, and he guarded the house during attacks. Anna would spend much of her time in Indiana reading on political topics, seeking out whatever newspapers and journals she could find. She had five more children while living in Indiana.

While William was away in the War of 1812, Anna took the children to her father's rented home in Cincinnati. Here she had her ninth child, and she joined the First Presbyterian Church. Anna's father died in 1814, and she inherited his land in North Bend. William retired from the military the same year, and they moved their log cabin, the Bend, onto the property. Their tenth and final child was born in 1814, but he died in 1817. Here she would receive many visitors, as her husband had become a war hero. She also began a practice of inviting the church congregation to her home after morning service each Sunday. Anna personally educated her children, and she eventually founded a school in North Bend. William was often away in the 1810s and 1820s, as he had a successful political career that took him to the United States Congress, the Ohio Senate, and the diplomatic mission to Colombia.

The Harrisons struggled in the 1820s and 1830s amid financial troubles and personal tragedies. Their finances were not efficiently managed, and they often had a limited budget. Their expenses grew as their children grew, with weddings and college tuition taking a toll on their finances. Their daughter Lucy died in 1826. Their son William accumulated considerable debt, which they took on. He died in 1830, followed by the deaths of three more sons in 1838, 1839, and 1840.

While Anna took pride in her husband's political and military accomplishments, she did not wish to see him become President of the United States. She disapproved of his presidential ambitions when he was a candidate in the 1836 and 1840 presidential elections. She was active in his campaign, hosting as prospective supporters visited their home in North Bend. Anna was well-read and knowledgeable about politics, and she was able to participate in political conversations with her husband's guests. William declined to campaign on Sundays due to Anna's observance of the Sabbath. She ended her involvement abruptly after the death of her son in 1840, and she became reclusive.

First Lady of the United States
When William was elected president in 1840, Anna wept. She was unhappy, saying "I wish that my husband's friends had left him where he is, happy and contented in retirement." She also worried about how she would perform as first lady, fearing that she would not be capable of the task or that she would not be well received by Washington society. At the age of 65, she was the oldest woman to that point to become first lady. William was inaugurated in 1841, but Anna did not accompany him to Washington, citing her illness and the harsh weather. In her stead, she sent Jane Irwin Harrison, the widow of their late son. Her intention was to join her husband at the White House in May. While she was preparing for her journey, she received news that her husband had died of pneumonia. She declined to travel to Washington for her husband's state funeral.

Later life and death
Harrison disapproved of her husband's successor, President John Tyler. Despite this, she used her influence as a former first lady to lobby the president, asking that he give political appointments to members of her family. In June 1841, she was also granted a pension by the federal government. William had acquired considerable debts in his life, and much of her pension was spent appeasing creditors. Harrison later lobbied the following president, James K. Polk, for military commissions for her grandsons. She became more religious later in life, and she followed politics more closely. She took a particular interest in the Civil War, taking an abolitionist stance and encouraging her grandsons to serve in the Union Army. 

Following her husband's death, she lived at her cabin in North Bend. The cabin was destroyed in a fire in 1855, after which she moved in with her only surviving child, John. Anna would outlive her husband by 23 years, and she survived all of her children but one. Harrison died on February 25, 1864, at age 88, and was buried at the William Henry Harrison Tomb State Memorial in North Bend. Her funeral sermon was preached by Horace Bushnell.

Legacy 
Anna Harrison was the first in a long series of first ladies that were unwilling or unable to carry out the duties associated with the role. She had little time to develop a reputation, as her husband died before she arrived at the White House. Harrison and her performance as first lady have not been the subject of significant scholarly analysis or debate. Historical analysis is further limited by the destruction of her personal papers during the fire at her log cabin. Presidential historians portray Harrison as a devoutly religious woman that was dedicated to her family. One subject of debate among historians is how much influence Harrison had over her husband, though recent historians have agreed that she generally had little say in her husband's career. She was the first wife of a president to have a formal education. One historian compared her to Rachel Jackson, as both were wives of men that were often away on military and political duties, both wished for their husbands to retire from private life, and both coped with these struggles with their Presbyterianism.

Harrison was the last first lady to be born before the inauguration of George Washington.She was the oldest woman to become first lady at the time, doing so at the age of 65. She held this record until 2021, when Jill Biden became first lady at the age of 69. She also holds records due to her husband's short term: she served the shortest tenure of any first lady, only holding the title for 31 days, and she is the only first lady to have never been to the national capital during her husband's presidency. Her grandson Benjamin Harrison became President of the United States in 1889, making Anna the first woman to be both the wife of a President of the United States and the grandmother of another President of the United States.

In the 1982 Siena College Research Institute asking historians to assess American first ladies, Harrison was included. The first ladies survey, which has been conducted periodically since, ranks first ladies according to a cumulative score on the independent criteria of their background, value to the country, intelligence, courage, accomplishments, integrity, leadership, being their own women, public image, and value to the president. In the 1982 survey, out of 42 first ladies and acting first ladies, Harrison was assessed as the 23rd most highly regarded among historians. Due to the brevity of her time as First Lady, Harrison has been excluded from subsequent iterations of the survey.

References

External links
 
Anna Harrison at C-SPAN's First Ladies: Influence & Image

1775 births
1864 deaths
18th-century American people
18th-century Presbyterians
18th-century American women
19th-century American women
19th-century Presbyterians
First ladies of the United States
Anna
People from Morristown, New Jersey
People from Sussex County, New Jersey
Spouses of Ohio politicians
People from Hamilton County, Ohio